Arianne Bethene Zucker (born June 3, 1974) is an American actress and model. She is known for playing Nicole Walker on the NBC daytime soap opera Days of Our Lives since 1998.

Early life
Zucker was born in Northridge, California, and raised in Chatsworth. Zucker's father is Christian, whereas her mother is Jewish. Her mother, Barbara, is a lab technologist and her father, Barry, is a plumber. She has an older brother, Todd.

Career

Zucker began modeling at the age of sixteen when she was discovered by a scout from It Models. Starting in Los Angeles, her career took her to locations around the world, including France, Japan, Australia and New York. She attended Chatsworth High School, graduating in 1992. While there, she was a cheerleader during her sophomore and junior years. She later described her cheerleading experience:

She appeared in several TV commercials, including national spots for Mazda and McDonald's. Settling in Los Angeles, she began studies as an actress at Los Angeles Pierce College. She was involved in several workshops that included her performances in Beth Henley's Crimes of the Heart and Neil Simon's The Last of the Red Hot Lovers.
She continued her studies at the Howard Fine Studio, where she has been a student for many years. In February 1998, she auditioned for and won the role of Nicole Walker on Days of Our Lives. In March 2017, Zucker announced she would be leaving Days of Our Lives.

Personal life
In 2002, Zucker married actor Kyle Lowder, who co-starred with her on Days of Our Lives as Brady Black. After five years of marriage, they separated briefly in August 2007, then reconciled in March 2008. They have one child. In March 2014, Zucker and Lowder confirmed they were divorced.

In October 2016, Zucker made headlines because she appeared in the Donald Trump Access Hollywood tape. Zucker responded to the controversy by issuing a statement, "It's not about me".

Filmography

Awards and nominations

References

External links

 
 Arianne Zucker's Official Website
 Arianne Zucker at ModelScouts.com

1974 births
American soap opera actresses
Jewish American actresses
Living people
People from Chatsworth, Los Angeles
Los Angeles Pierce College people
20th-century American actresses
21st-century American actresses
21st-century American Jews